"Shinin' On" is a popular song written by Don Brewer and Mark Farner and recorded by Grand Funk as the title track for the band's 1974 album. Released as a single, it reached No. 11 on the Billboard Hot 100 in the US, and number 13 in Canada.

Charts

References

1974 songs
1974 singles
Grand Funk Railroad songs